SMK can refer to:

Statens Museum for Kunst, the Danish National Gallery
SMK tank, a Soviet heavy tank prototype
Slagsmålsklubben, Swedish band
Sekolah Menengah Kejuruan, a type of high school in Indonesia
Super Mario Kart, the first game in Nintendo's Mario Kart series, released in 1992 for the SNES
Sekolah Menengah Kebangsaan, a type of government owned public schools in Malaysia
SMK-MKP, Strana maďarskej koalície Party of the Hungarian Coalition in Slovakia
SMK- Composite Bridge System in dentistry
Sam Kee LRT station, Punggol, LRT station abbreviation
Stowmarket railway station, England, National Rail code
Smacker video, computer filename extension
A variant of the SMA coax connector
Office of the Prime Minister (Norway), Statsministerens kontor (SMK) - a cabinet department